Depression is a mental state of low mood and aversion to activity. It affects more than 280 million people of all ages (about 3.5% of the global population). Depression affects a person's thoughts, behavior, feelings, and sense of well-being. Depressed people often experience loss of motivation or interest in, or reduced pleasure or joy from, experiences that would normally bring them pleasure or joy. Depressed mood is a symptom of some mood disorders such as major depressive disorder and dysthymia; it is a normal temporary reaction to life events, such as the loss of a loved one; and it is also a symptom of some physical diseases and a side effect of some drugs and medical treatments.
It may feature sadness, difficulty in thinking and concentration and a significant increase or decrease in appetite and time spent sleeping. People experiencing depression may have feelings of dejection or hopelessness and may experience suicidal thoughts. It can either be short term or long term.

Contributing factors

Life events 
Adversity in childhood, such as bereavement, neglect, mental abuse, physical abuse, sexual abuse, or unequal parental treatment of siblings can contribute to depression in adulthood. Childhood physical or sexual abuse in particular significantly correlates with the likelihood of experiencing depression over the survivor's lifetime.

Life events and changes that may cause depressed mood include (but are not limited to): childbirth, menopause, financial difficulties, unemployment, stress (such as from work, education, family, living conditions etc.), a medical diagnosis (cancer, HIV, etc.), bullying, loss of a loved one, natural disasters, social isolation, rape, relationship troubles, jealousy, separation, or catastrophic injury. Adolescents may be especially prone to experiencing a depressed mood following social rejection, peer pressure, or bullying.

Personality 
Depression is associated with low extraversion, and people who have high levels of neuroticism are more likely to experience depressive symptoms and are more likely to receive a diagnosis of a depressive disorder.

Side effect of medical treatment 
It is possible that some early-generation beta-blockers induce depression in some patients, though the evidence for this is weak and conflicting. There is strong evidence for a link between alpha interferon therapy and depression. One study found that a third of alpha interferon-treated patients had developed depression after three months of treatment. (Beta interferon therapy appears to have no effect on rates of depression.) There is moderately strong evidence that finasteride when used in the treatment of alopecia increases depressive symptoms in some patients. Evidence linking isotretinoin, an acne treatment, to depression is strong.  Other medicines that seem to increase the risk of depression include anticonvulsants, antimigraine drugs, antipsychotics and hormonal agents such as gonadotropin-releasing hormone agonist

Substance-induced 
Several drugs of abuse can cause or exacerbate depression, whether in intoxication, withdrawal, and from chronic use. These include alcohol, sedatives (including prescription benzodiazepines), opioids (including prescription pain killers and illicit drugs such as heroin), stimulants (such as cocaine and amphetamines), hallucinogens, and inhalants.

Non-psychiatric illnesses 

Depressed mood can be the result of a number of infectious diseases, nutritional deficiencies, neurological conditions, and physiological problems, including hypoandrogenism (in men), addison's disease, cushing's syndrome, pernicious anemia, hypothyroidism, hyperparathyroidism, Lyme disease, multiple sclerosis, Parkinson's disease, chronic pain, stroke, diabetes, and cancer.

Psychiatric syndromes 

A number of psychiatric syndromes feature depressed mood as a main symptom. The mood disorders are a group of disorders considered to be primary disturbances of mood. These include major depressive disorder (commonly called major depression or clinical depression) where a person has at least two weeks of depressed mood or a loss of interest or pleasure in nearly all activities; and dysthymia, a state of chronic depressed mood, the symptoms of which do not meet the severity of a major depressive episode. Another mood disorder, bipolar disorder, features one or more episodes of abnormally elevated mood, cognition, and energy levels, but may also involve one or more episodes of depression. When the course of depressive episodes follows a seasonal pattern, the disorder (major depressive disorder, bipolar disorder, etc.) may be described as a seasonal affective disorder.

Outside the mood disorders: borderline personality disorder often features an extremely intense depressive mood; adjustment disorder with depressed mood is a psychological response to an identifiable event or stressor, in which the resulting emotional or behavioral symptoms are significant but do not meet the criteria for a major depressive episode; and posttraumatic stress disorder, a mental disorder that sometimes follows trauma, is commonly accompanied by depressed mood.

Historical legacy 

Researchers have begun to conceptualize ways in which the historical legacies of racism and colonialism may create depressive conditions.

Measures 
Measures of depression include, but are not limited to: Beck Depression Inventory-11 and the 9-item depression scale in the Patient Health Questionnaire (PHQ-9). Both of these measures are psychological tests that ask personal questions of the participant, and have mostly been used to measure the severity of depression. The Beck Depression Inventory is a self-report scale that helps a therapist identify the patterns of depression symptoms and monitor recovery. The responses on this scale can be discussed in therapy to devise interventions for the most distressing symptoms of depression.

Theories 
Schools of depression theories include:
 Cognitive theory of depression
 Tripartite Model of Anxiety and Depression
 Behavioral theories of depression
 Evolutionary approaches to depression
 Biology of depression
 Epigenetics of depression

Management 

Depressed mood may not require professional treatment, and may be a normal temporary reaction to life events, a symptom of some medical condition, or a side effect of some drugs or medical treatments. A prolonged depressed mood, especially in combination with other symptoms, may lead to a diagnosis of a psychiatric or medical condition which may benefit from treatment. 

The UK National Institute for Health and Care Excellence (NICE) 2009 guidelines indicate that antidepressants should not be routinely used for the initial treatment of mild depression, because the risk-benefit ratio is poor. 

Physical activity has a protective effect against the emergence of depression in some people.

There is limited evidence suggesting yoga may help some people with depressive disorders or elevated levels of depression, but more research is needed.

Reminiscence of old and fond memories is another alternative form of treatment, especially for the elderly who have lived longer and have more experiences in life. It is a method that causes a person to recollect memories of their own life, leading to a process of self-recognition and identifying familiar stimuli. By maintaining one's personal past and identity, it is a technique that stimulates people to view their lives in a more objective and balanced way, causing them to pay attention to positive information in their life stories, which would successfully reduce depressive mood levels.

There is limited evidence that continuing antidepressant medication for one year reduces the risk of depression recurrence with no additional harm. Recommendations for psychological treatments or combination treatments in preventing recurrence are not clear.

Epidemiology

Depression is the leading cause of disability worldwide, the United Nations (UN) health agency reported, estimating that it affects more than 300 million people worldwide – the majority of them women, young people and the elderly. An estimated 4.4 percent of the global population has depression, according to a report released by the UN World Health Organization (WHO), which shows an 18 percent increase in the number of people living with depression between 2005 and 2015.

Depression is a major mental-health cause of disease burden. Its consequences further lead to significant burden in public health, including a higher risk of dementia, premature mortality arising from physical disorders, and maternal depression impacts on child growth and development. Approximately 76% to 85% of depressed people in low- and middle-income countries do not receive treatment; barriers to treatment include: inaccurate assessment, lack of trained health-care providers, social stigma and lack of resources.

The stigma comes from misguided societal views that people with mental illness are different from everyone else, and they can choose to get better only if they wanted to. Due to this more than half of the people with depression do not receive help with their disorders. The stigma leads to a strong preference for privacy.

The World Health Organization has constructed guidelines – known as The Mental Health Gap Action Programme (mhGAP) – aiming to increase services for people with mental, neurological and substance-use disorders. Depression is listed as one of conditions prioritized by the programme. Trials conducted show possibilities for the implementation of the programme in low-resource primary-care settings dependent on primary-care practitioners and lay health-workers.
Examples of mhGAP-endorsed therapies targeting depression include Group Interpersonal Therapy as group treatment for depression and "Thinking Health", which utilizes cognitive behavioral therapy to tackle perinatal depression. Furthermore, effective screening in primary care is crucial for the access of treatments. The mhGAP adopted its approach of improving detection rates of depression by training general practitioners. However, there is still weak evidence supporting this training.

History 
The term depression was derived from the Latin verb , "to press down". From the 14th century, "to depress" meant to subjugate or to bring down in spirits. It was used in 1665 in English author Richard Baker's Chronicle to refer to someone having "a great depression of spirit", and by English author Samuel Johnson in a similar sense in 1753.

In Ancient Greece, disease was thought due to an imbalance in the four basic bodily fluids, or humors. Personality types were similarly thought to be determined by the dominant humor in a particular person.

During the 18th century, the humoral theory of melancholia was increasingly being challenged by mechanical and electrical explanations; references to dark and gloomy states gave way to ideas of slowed circulation and depleted energy. German physician Johann Christian Heinroth, however, argued melancholia was a disturbance of the soul due to moral conflict within the patient.

In the 20th century, the German psychiatrist Emil Kraepelin distinguished manic depression. The influential system put forward by Kraepelin unified nearly all types of mood disorder into manic–depressive insanity. Kraepelin worked from an assumption of underlying brain pathology, but also promoted a distinction between endogenous (internally caused) and exogenous (externally caused) types. 

Other psycho-dynamic theories were proposed. Existential and humanistic theories represented a forceful affirmation of individualism. Austrian existential psychiatrist Viktor Frankl connected depression to feelings of futility and meaninglessness. Frankl's logotherapy addressed the filling of an "existential vacuum" associated with such feelings, and may be particularly useful for depressed adolescents.

Researchers theorized that depression was caused by a chemical imbalance in neurotransmitters in the brain, a theory based on observations made in the 1950s of the effects of reserpine and isoniazid in altering monoamine neurotransmitter levels and affecting depressive symptoms. During the 1960s and 70s, manic-depression came to refer to just one type of mood disorder (now most commonly known as bipolar disorder) which was distinguished from (unipolar) depression. The terms unipolar and bipolar had been coined by German psychiatrist Karl Kleist.

In July 2022, British psychiatrist Joanna Moncrieff, also psychiatrist Mark Horowtiz and others proposed in a study on academic journal Molecular Psychiatry that depression is not caused by a serotonin imbalance in the human body, unlike what most of the psychiatry community points to, and that therefore anti-depressants don't work against the illness. However, such study was met with criticism from some psychiatrists, who argued the study's methodology used an indirect trace of serotonin, instead of taking direct measurements of the molecule. Moncrieff said that, despite her study's conclusions, no one should interrupt their treatment if they are taking any anti-depressant.

See also

References

External links 

 

 
Emotions
Neuropsychology
Mental states